Leci Brandão (Rio de Janeiro, September 12, 1944) is a Brazilian politician, singer and composer of Brazilian Popular Music (Música Popular Brasileira or MPB). She is the daughter of Pérola Negra, one of the artists who pioneered in making the Brazilian pagode music popular throughout the land.  Her performance of "Quero Sim" won the National Meeting of Samba Composers in 1973.

One of Leci Brandão's latest performances was in 2005 with Raça Brasileira: 20 Anos (DVD: 'Raca Brasileira', rated NR, one hour/2005) with many other Brazilian samba greats (i.e. Beth Carvalho, Arlindo Cruz, Almir Guineto, etc.).

As an Black Brazilian, a woman, and an artist, Leci Brandão has long taken opportunities to declare herself against racism and all other forms of discrimination. She has lent her name, voice and cache by performing in LGBT events against homophobia. In the 2012 carnival, she was honored by the Escola de samba Académicos del Tatuapé.

Discography 

 (1974) A música de Donga • Discos Marcus Pereira • LP
 (1974) Leci Brandão • Selo Marcus Pereira • Compacto Duplo
 (1975) Antes que eu volte a ser nada • Selo Marcus Pereira • LP
 (1976) Questão de gosto • Polydor • LP
 (1977) Coisas do meu pessoal • Polydor • LP
 (1979) Metades • Polydor • LP
 (1980) Essa tal criatura • Polydor • LP
 (1985) Leci Brandão • Copacabana Discos • LP
 (1987) Dignidade • Copacabana Discos • LP
 (1988) Um beijo no seu coração • Copacabana Discos • LP
 (1989) As coisas que mamãe me ensinou • Copacabana Discos • LP
 (1990) Cidadã brasileira • Copacabana Discos • CD
 (1995) Anjos da guarda • RGE • CD
 (1995) Atitudes • RGE • CD
 (1996) Sucessos de Leci Brandão • Copacabana Discos • CD
 (1996) Somos da mesma tribo • Movieplay • CD
 (1999) Auto-estima • Trama Music • CD
 (2000) Os melhores do ano II – ao vivo • Indie Records • CD
 (2000) Eu sou assim • Trama • CD
 (2000) Casa de samba 4 • Universal Music • CD
 (2001) Leci & convidados • Indie Records • CD
 (2002) Jorge Aragão ao vivo convida • Indie Records
 (2002) A filhada Dona Lecy – ao vivo • Indie Records • CD
 (2002) Os melhores do ano III • Indie Records • CD
 (2003) A cara do povo • Indie Records • CD
 (2007) Canções afirmativas – Ao vivo • Indie Records
 (2008) Eu e o Samba • Som Livre • CD
 (2010) Disney Adventures in Samba (participação) • Walt Disney Records • DVD
 (2010) Disney Adventures in Samba (participação) • Walt Disney Records • CD
 (2011) Isso é Leci Brandão (coletânea) • Microservice • CD
 (2011) O canto livre de Leci Brandão (coletânea) • Universal Music • CD
 (2011) Uma flor para Nelson Cavaquinho (participação) • Lua Music • CD
 (2017) Simples Assim – Leci Brandão • produção independente • CD

Filmography 

 1996: Xica da Silva
 2007: Antônia: O Filme
 2010: Tropa de Elite 2 – O Inimigo Agora é Outro
 2015: O Samba

References 

1944 births
Living people
Brazilian composers
20th-century Brazilian women singers
20th-century Brazilian singers
Musicians from Rio de Janeiro (city)
Afro-Brazilian women singers
Brazilian LGBT singers
Communist Party of Brazil politicians
21st-century Brazilian women singers
21st-century Brazilian singers
LGBT people in Latin music
Women in Latin music